Balsas may refer to:

Places
 Balsas, Maranhão, Brazil
 Balsas, Ecuador
Balsas Canton
 Balsas District, Chachapoyas Province, Peru
 Balsas, Guerrero, Mexico

Rivers
 Balsas River, in Mexico
 Balsas River (Panama)
 Das Balsas River (disambiguation)

Other uses
 Balsas (plant), a genus of the Sapindoideae flowering plants
 Balsa (ship), reed boats or ships of pre-Columbian South American civilizations

See also

Balsa (disambiguation)
Balsas dry forests, in Mexico